Clandestine Blaze / Deathspell Omega – Split is an album released by the black metal bands Clandestine Blaze and Deathspell Omega in 2001.

Track listing

Clandestine Blaze 
"Will to Kill" - 07:47
"Blasphemous Lust" - 02:42
"Raping the Innocent" - 03:20
"Genocide Operation" - 08:21

Deathspell Omega 
"Bestial Orgies" - 05:47
"The Suicide Curse" - 07:53
"Seal of Perversion" - 07:07

Release information 
The CD version was released by Northern Heritage in 2001.
The LP version was released by Northern Heritage in 2001 and it was limited to 300 copies.
The CD version was re-released by Northern Heritage in 2003.

Clandestine Blaze albums
Deathspell Omega albums
2001 compilation albums
Split albums